February 2017

See also

References 

 02
February 2017 events in the United States